Microstachys is a genus of plants in the Euphorbiaceae first described as a genus in 1824. It is native to tropical Africa, southern Asia, Australia, Papuasia, Mesoamerica, the West Indies, and South America.

Species

formerly included
moved to other genera (Micrococca Sebastiania )
 M. mercurialis - Micrococca mercurialis 
 M. ramosissima - Sebastiania brasiliensis

References

Euphorbiaceae genera
Hippomaneae